Sino-Xenic or Sinoxenic pronunciations are regular systems for reading Chinese characters in Japan, Korea and Vietnam, originating in medieval times and the source of large-scale borrowings of Chinese words into the Japanese, Korean and Vietnamese languages, none of which are genetically related to Chinese. The resulting Sino-Japanese, Sino-Korean and Sino-Vietnamese vocabularies now make up a large part of the lexicons of these languages. The pronunciation systems are used alongside modern varieties of Chinese in historical Chinese phonology, particularly the reconstruction of the sounds of Middle Chinese. Some other languages, such as Hmong–Mien and Kra–Dai languages, also contain large numbers of Chinese loanwords but without the systematic correspondences that characterize Sino-Xenic vocabularies.

The term, from the Greek  ('foreign'), was coined in 1953 by the linguist Samuel Martin, who called these borrowings "Sino-Xenic dialects".

Background 

There had been borrowings of Chinese vocabulary into Vietnamese and Korean from the Han period, but around the time of the Tang dynasty (618–907) Chinese writing, language and culture were imported wholesale into Vietnam, Korea and Japan.
Scholars in those countries wrote in Literary Chinese and were thoroughly familiar with the Chinese classics, which they read aloud in systematic local approximations of Middle Chinese. With those pronunciations, Chinese words entered Vietnamese, Korean and Japanese in huge numbers.

The plains of northern Vietnam were under Chinese control for most of the period from 111 BC to AD 938 and, after independence, the country adopted Literary Chinese as the language of administration and scholarship. As a result, there are several layers of Chinese loanwords in Vietnamese. The oldest loans, roughly 400 words dating from the Eastern Han, have been fully assimilated and are treated as native Vietnamese words. Sino-Vietnamese proper dates to the early Tang dynasty, when the spread of Chinese rhyme dictionaries and other literature resulted in the wholesale importation of the Chinese lexicon.

Isolated Chinese words also began to enter Korean from the 1st century BC, but the main influx occurred in the 7th and 8th centuries AD after the unification of the peninsula by Silla. The flow of Chinese words into Korean became overwhelming after the establishment of civil service examinations in 958.

Japanese, in contrast, has two well-preserved layers and a third that is also significant:
 Go-on readings date to the introduction of Buddhism to Japan from Korea in the 6th century. They are believed to reflect pronunciations of the lower Yangtze area in the late Northern and Southern dynasties period.
 Kan-on readings are believed to reflect the standard pronunciation of the Tang period, as used in the cities of Chang'an and Luoyang.
 Tōsō-on readings were introduced by followers of Zen Buddhism in the 14th century and are thought to be based on the speech of Hangzhou.

In comparison, vocabulary of Chinese origin in Thai, including most of the basic numbers was borrowed over a range of periods from the Han (or earlier) to the Tang.

Since the pioneering work of Bernhard Karlgren, these bodies of pronunciations have been used together with modern varieties of Chinese in attempts to reconstruct the sounds of Middle Chinese.
They provide such broad and systematic coverage that the linguist Samuel Martin called them "Sino-Xenic dialects", treating them as parallel branches with the native Chinese dialects.
The foreign pronunciations sometimes retain distinctions lost in all the modern Chinese varieties, as in the case of the chongniu distinction found in Middle Chinese rhyme dictionaries.
Similarly, the distinction between grades III and IV made by the Late Middle Chinese rime tables has disappeared in most modern varieties, but in Kan-on, grade IV is represented by the Old Japanese vowels i1 and e1 while grade III is represented by i2 and e2.

Vietnamese, Korean and Japanese scholars also later each adapted the Chinese script to write their languages, using Chinese characters both for borrowed and native vocabulary. Thus, in the Japanese script, Chinese characters may have both Sino-Japanese readings and native readings. Similarly, in the  script used for Vietnamese until the early 20th century, some Chinese characters could represent both a Sino-Vietnamese word and a native Vietnamese word with similar meaning or sound to the Chinese word, but in such cases, the native reading would be distinguished by a  component. However, the Korean variant of Chinese characters, or hanja, typically have only a Sino-Korean reading, and native Korean words are rarely, if ever, written in hanja. The character-based Vietnamese and Korean scripts have since been replaced by the Vietnamese alphabet and hangul respectively, although Korean does still use Hanja characters to an extent.

Sound correspondences 
Foreign pronunciations of these words inevitably only approximated the original Chinese, and many distinctions were lost. In particular, Korean and Japanese had far fewer consonants and much simpler syllables than Chinese, and they lacked tones. Even Vietnamese merged some Chinese initial consonants (for example, several different consonants were merged into t and th while ph corresponds to both p and f in Mandarin). A further complication is that the various borrowings are based on different local pronunciations at different periods. Nevertheless, it is common to treat the pronunciations as developments from the categories of the Middle Chinese rhyme dictionaries.

Middle Chinese is recorded as having eight series of initial consonants, though it is likely that no single dialect distinguished them all.
Stops and affricates could also be voiced, voiceless or voiceless aspirated. Early Vietnamese had a similar three-way division, but the voicing contrast would later disappear in the tone split that affected several languages in the Mainland Southeast Asia linguistic area, including Vietnamese and most Chinese varieties. Old Japanese had only a two-way contrast based on voicing, while Middle Korean had only one obstruent at each point of articulation.

The Middle Chinese final consonants were semivowels (or glides) /j/ and /w/, nasals /m/, /n/ and /ŋ/, and stops /p/, /t/ and /k/.
Sino-Vietnamese and Sino-Korean preserve all the distinctions between final nasals and stops, like southern Chinese varieties such as Yue.
Sino-Vietnamese has added allophonic distinctions to -ng and -k, based on whether the preceding vowel is front (-nh, -ch) or back (-ng, -c).
Although Old Korean had a /t/ coda, words with the Middle Chinese coda /t/ have /l/ in Sino-Korean, reflecting a northern variety of Late Middle Chinese in which final /t/ had weakened to /r/.

In Go-on and Kan-on, the Middle Chinese coda -ng yielded a nasalized vowel, which in combination with the preceding vowel has become a long vowel in modern Japanese. For example, Tōkyō , is Dōngjīng in Mandarin Chinese. Also, as Japanese cannot end words with consonants (except for moraic n), borrowings of Middle Chinese words ending in a stop had a paragoge added so that, for example, Middle Chinese kwok was borrowed as koku. The later, less common Tōsō-on borrowings, however, reflect the reduction of final stops in Lower Yangtze Mandarin varieties to a glottal stop, reflected by Japanese /Q/.

Middle Chinese had a three-way tonal contrast in syllables with vocalic or nasal endings. As Japanese lacks tones, Sino-Japanese borrowings preserve no trace of Chinese tones.
Most Middle Chinese tones were preserved in the tones of Middle Korean, but they have since been lost in all but a few dialects.
Sino-Vietnamese, in contrast, reflects the Chinese tones fairly faithfully, including the Late Middle Chinese split of each tone into two registers conditioned by voicing of the initial.
The correspondence to the Chinese rising and departing tones is reversed from the earlier loans, so the Vietnamese hỏi and ngã tones reflect the Chinese upper and lower rising tone while the sắc and nặng tones reflect the upper and lower departing tone.
Unlike northern Chinese varieties, Sino-Vietnamese places level-tone words with sonorant and glottal stop initials in the upper level (ngang) category.

Structural effects 
Large numbers of Chinese words were borrowed into Vietnamese, Korean and Japanese and still form a large and important part of their lexicons.

In the case of Japanese, the influx has led to changes in the phonological structure of the language. Old Japanese syllables had the form (C)V, with vowel sequences being avoided.
Voiced sounds (b, d, z, g and r) were now permitted in word-initial position, where they had previously been impossible.

The influx of Chinese vocabulary contributed to the development of Middle Korean tones, which are still present in some dialects.
Sino-Korean words have also disrupted the native structure in which l does not occur in word-initial position, and words show vowel harmony.

Chinese morphemes have been used extensively in all these languages to coin compound words for new concepts in a similar way to the use of Latin and Ancient Greek roots in English.
Many new compounds, or new meanings for old phrases, were created in the late 19th and early 20th centuries to name Western concepts and artifacts. The coinages, written in shared Chinese characters, have then been borrowed freely between languages. They have even been accepted into Chinese, a language usually resistant to loanwords, because their foreign origin was hidden by their written form.
Often, different compounds for the same concept were in circulation for some time before a winner emerged, and sometimes, the final choice differed between countries.

The proportion of vocabulary of Chinese origin thus tends to be greater in technical, scientific, abstract or formal language or registers. For example, Sino-Japanese words account for about 35% of the words in entertainment magazines (where borrowings from English are common), over half the words in newspapers and 60% of the words in science magazines.

See also 
 Chinese family of scripts
 East Asian cultural sphere
 East Asian languages
 Mainland Southeast Asia linguistic area
 Non-Sinoxenic pronunciations
 East Asia

Other languages
 Church Slavonic#Recensions, for the similar practice in Eastern Orthodox communities when pronouncing the Church Slavonic language.
 Pronunciation of Ancient Greek in teaching, for the similar practice in Europe when pronouncing the Ancient Greek language.
 Latin regional pronunciation, for the similar practice in several European countries when pronouncing the Latin language.

Notes

References

Citations

Works cited 

 
 
 
 
 
 
 
  (review)

Further reading 

Chinese characters
Middle Chinese
East Asian culture
Phonology
Language_comparison